Hogna baltimoriana is a species of wolf spider in the family Lycosidae. It is found in the USA and Canada.

References

Further reading

 
 
 

Lycosidae
Spiders described in 1877